Vice Admiral Daniel Patrick Holloway Jr. (born 1956) is an American businessman and a retired flag officer of the United States Navy. He is vice president of customer relations for Huntington Ingalls Shipbuilding and is based at HII's Washington, D.C., office. He retired from the Navy in 2011–12, with his final post being Commander, United States Second Fleet, and Director, Combined Joint Operations from the Sea Center of Excellence.

Early life
Holloway was born in Philadelphia, Pennsylvania, and was raised in Maple Shade, New Jersey.

Naval career
Holloway graduated from the United States Naval Academy, Annapolis, Maryland, in 1978. At sea, he served as the damage control assistant and navigator aboard , engineer officer aboard , and commissioning engineer officer aboard . He was the executive officer aboard  and served as the chief staff officer to commander, Destroyer Squadron 24. He commanded  and Destroyer Squadron 18 and served as commander, Carrier Strike Group Twelve/Enterprise Strike Group from February 2007 to August 2008.

Ashore, Holloway served as the nuclear power officer recruiter at Naval Recruiting District, Philadelphia, and as an instructor and executive assistant for the chairman, Seamanship and Navigation Department at the United States Naval Academy's Professional Development Division. He also served as the assistant commander assignment officer and the cruiser destroyer placement branch chief at the Navy Military Personnel Command, on the Joint Staff in the Information Operations Directorate (J39), as director, Surface Officer Distribution Division (PERS-41) and as assistant commander, Navy Personnel Command for Career Management (PERS-4) in Millington, Tennessee.

Holloway earned a Master of Science degree in Management Information Systems from George Washington University and a master's degree in National Security and Strategic Studies from the National War College. His final assignment was as Commander, United States Second Fleet and Director, Combined Joint Operations from the Sea Center of Excellence.

References

External links
 Second Fleet Biography 

1956 births
Living people
United States Naval Academy alumni
George Washington University alumni
National War College alumni
United States Navy personnel of the Gulf War
Recipients of the Legion of Merit
United States Navy admirals